Notre Dame High School is a private, Roman Catholic high school in Batavia, New York within the Diocese of Buffalo.

Background
Notre Dame was established in 1951.  Notre Dame is the only Catholic high school between Buffalo and Rochester. The school serves 7-12 grades in a college prep curriculum.

References

Catholic secondary schools in New York (state)
Educational institutions established in 1951
Schools in Genesee County, New York
1951 establishments in New York (state)